Alexandra Asanovna Elbakyan (born 6 November 1988) is a Kazakhstani computer programmer and creator of the website Sci-Hub, which provides free access to research papers without regard for copyright. According to a study published in 2018, Sci-Hub provides access to nearly all scholarly literature.

Elbakyan has been described as "Science's Pirate Queen". In 2016, Nature included her in their list of the top ten "people who mattered" in science. Since 2011, she has been living in Russia.

Youth 
Elbakyan was born in Almaty, Kazakh Soviet Socialist Republic (then called Alma-Ata in the Soviet Union), on 6 November 1988. She identifies as "multiracial having ... Armenian, Slavic and Asian roots." Alexandra was raised by a single mother, who was an accomplished computer programmer.

Alexandra started programming at the age of 12, making web pages in HTML and later writing in PHP, Delphi, and Assembly languages. She attempted to create a Tamagotchi powered by artificial intelligence. She performed her first computer hack at the age of 14; using SQL injection, she obtained access to all logins and passwords of her home internet provider. Later, she discovered there were more vulnerabilities of the cross-site scripting type. She reported these issues to the internet provider, hoping to get a job with them, but this did not happen. Instead, the provider cut off her internet access. Alexandra wrote in her blog that she first hacked a publisher's website when she was 15. The publisher was MIT Press, which published online books on neuroscience, but they were locked behind a paywall that she could not afford. Alexandra wrote a PHP program that exploited a vulnerability on the website to download paywalled books without payment.

Studies 
In 2009, she obtained a Bachelor of Science degree in computer science from the Kazakh National Technical University, specializing in information security. She studied the possibility of using EEG brainwaves for authentication instead of using a password. While working on her thesis, Elbakyan discovered the paywall problem with accessing journal articles, as her university did not have access to many publications related to her work.

Alexandra became interested in developing brain–computer interfaces and in 2010 she joined the University of Freiburg to work on such a project, which eventually led to her summer internship in neuroscience at Georgia Institute of Technology in the United States. The same year, Elbakyan spoke at the Humanity+ Summit at Harvard on the topic "Brain-Computer Interfacing, Consciousness, and the Global Brain". Elbakyan's idea was to develop a new kind of brain-machine interface that would merge human and machine qualia. She also participated in the Towards a Science of Consciousness conference that was held in Tucson, Arizona with the poster "Consciousness in Mixed Systems: Merging Artificial and Biological Minds via Brain-Machine Interface".

From 2012 to 2014, she was a master's student at Higher School of Economics in Moscow, but then dropped out. According to a 2016 interview, her neuroscience research was on hold, but she was enrolled in a history of science master's program at a private university in an undisclosed location. Her thesis would focus on scientific communication. In 2019, she graduated from Saint Petersburg State University with a master's degree in linguistics. She currently lives in Moscow and is studying philosophy at the Russian Academy of Sciences.

Sci-Hub 

According to Elbakyan, Sci-Hub is a simplified version of a Global Brain because it "connects [the] brains of many researchers."

Elbakyan developed Sci-Hub in 2011 when she was in Kazakhstan. It was characterized by Science correspondent John Bohannon as "an awe-inspiring act of altruism or a massive criminal enterprise, depending on whom you ask." Elbakyan has stated that the script was initially intended to make access to academic papers fast and convenient, without a global goal of making all science free.

When academic publisher Elsevier sued Sci-Hub in the US in 2015, Elbakyan wrote a letter to the judge, wherein she explained her motives for starting the project: she could not afford to pay for each of the hundreds of papers she needed for her research project, so she had to pirate them. She founded her website to help others in the same situation. In the letter Elbakyan has provided various arguments in support for her cause, such as Elsevier not being an author of papers, and not paying the authors, mentioning that "The general opinion in research community is that research papers should be distributed for free (open access), not sold".

Elsevier was granted an injunction against her and $15 million in damages. Following a lawsuit, Elbakyan remained in hiding due to the risk of extradition. There were also lawsuits against Sci-Hub and Elbakyan from other publishers and in other countries.

On 17 February 2023, a court in India, related to a lawsuit brought by publishers, was reported to have failed to dismiss a blocking application submitted by the legal representatives of Sci-Hub; nonetheless, these legal representatives may follow up this court action with proceedings based on other, perhaps more promising, legal strategies. Additionally, the revoked .SE domain of Sci-Hub, in a different court case, has now been restored due to a successful "ownership verification process."

Recognition and awards 

In December 2016, Nature named Elbakyan as one of the 10 people who most mattered in science that year. Researchers who use Sci-Hub often thank Elbakyan in the Acknowledgments section of their papers.

For her actions in creating Sci-Hub, Elbakyan has been called a hero, for example by Nobel laureate Randy Schekman. Ars Technica has compared her to Aaron Swartz, and The New York Times has compared her to Edward Snowden. Edward Snowden acknowledged Sci-Hub to be one of the most important websites for academics in the world. She has also been called a modern-day "Robin Hood" and a "Robin Hood of science" and "Science's Pirate Queen".

Elbakyan has several biological species named in her honor:

 Idiogramma elbakyanae, a species of parasitoid wasps discovered by Russian and Mexican entomologists in 2017. Elbakyan was offended by this, saying that "the real parasites are scientific publishers, and Sci-Hub, on the contrary, fights for equal access to scientific information." The Russian entomologist responded that he supports Sci-Hub and naming was not an insult. The article says that "The species is named in honour of Alexandra Elbakyan (Kazakhstan/Russia), creator of the web-site Sci-Hub, in recognition of her contribution to making scientific knowledge available for all researchers."
 , an extinct species of catfish discovered by Argentine paleontologists in 2020.
 , a species of flowering plant from Mexico discovered in 2020. (At first Spigelia elbakyanii, then changed by the authors because the "correct termination, however, for an epithet dedicated to a woman (Alexandra Elbakyan) is -iae, instead of -ii".
 Amphisbaena elbakyanae, a species of worm lizard discovered in 2021.
 , a species of deep-sea snail discovered by researchers from Russia and France in 2021.

Elbakyan was nominated twice for John Maddox Prize and made it to the final shortlist. Some researchers say that Elbakyan deserves a Nobel Prize for her work. Wildlife scientist T R Shankar Raman has stated in an interview: "I am not a fan of the Nobel Prizes, given they have their own biases and have failed to adequately acknowledge scientific contributions of women, for example. But given that its stated purpose is to award those who have conferred the greatest benefit to humankind, Alexandra Elbakyan certainly qualifies."

Views 
Elbakyan is a strong supporter of the open access movement. According to her, Sci-Hub is a true implementation of open access principle in science. She believes that science should be open to all and not behind paywalls.

She has described herself as a devout pirate and thinks that copyright law prevents the free exchange of information online and the free distribution of knowledge on the Internet. In 2018, she asked supporters of Sci-Hub to join their local Pirate Party in order to fight for copyright laws to be changed.

Elbakyan has stated that she is inspired by communist ideals, and considers the common ownership of ideas to be essential for scientific progress. In her 2016 interview to Vox, she said: "I like the idea of communism, and the idea that knowledge should be common and not intellectual property is very relevant. That is especially true for information. Research articles are used for communication in science. But the word "communication" implies common ownership by itself." She referenced the work of Robert Merton, who considered communism to be a part of scientific ethos. According to her, Sci-Hub is fighting for communism in science and against the current state of things when knowledge has become the private property of corporations, because knowledge belongs to everyone.

Elbakyan does not consider herself a strict Marxist. She wanted to join either the Communist Party of the Russian Federation or Pirate Party of Russia, but was unable to as membership in political parties is restricted to those with Russian citizenship.

Elbakyan justified Sci-Hub by saying that lack of universal access to academic knowledge violates Article 27 of the United Nations’ Universal Declaration of Human Rights, which states that "everyone has the right freely to … share in scientific advancement and its benefits."

She has stated that she supports a strong state which can stand up to the Western world, and that she does not want "the scientists of Russia and of my native Kazakhstan to share the fates of the scientists of Iraq, Libya, and Syria, that were 'helped' by the United States to become more democratic." In 2012, she supported Putin's politics, but in 2018 she expressed support for the Pirate Party, which is in opposition to Putin.

Controversies 

Elbakyan was in conflict with the liberal, pro-Western wing of the Russian scientific community. According to her interview, she was attacked on the Internet by 'science popularizers' who supported liberal views that led to the shutdown of Sci-Hub in Russia in 2017 for a few days. In particular, Elbakyan was strongly critical of the former Dynasty Foundation (shut down in 2015) and its associated figures. She believes that the foundation was politicized, tied to Russia's liberal opposition, and fit the legal definition of a "foreign agent". Dynasty's founder, in her opinion, financed researchers whose political views agreed with its own. Elbakyan states that after she began to investigate the foundation's activities and published her findings online, she became the target of a cyberharassment campaign by Dynasty's supporters.

In December 2019, The Washington Post reported that Elbakyan was under investigation by the US Justice Department for suspected ties to Russia's military intelligence arm, the GRU, to steal U.S. military secrets from defense contractors. Elbakyan has denied this, saying that Sci-Hub "is not in any way directly affiliated with Russian or some other country's intelligence," but noting that "of course, there could be some indirect help. The same as with donations, anyone can send them; they are completely anonymous, so I do not know who exactly is donating to Sci-Hub. There could be some help that I’m simply unaware of. I can only add that I write all of Sci-Hub code and design myself and I’m doing the server’s configuration."

On May 8, 2021, Elbakyan tweeted that the FBI had served a subpoena to Apple seeking her iCloud data. The tweet included a screengrab of the notice from Apple. The tweet was retweeted by Edward Snowden, who commented: "Members of Congress should be making calls about this. Journalists should be asking the White House and DOJ questions. The founder of Sci-hub — unquestionably one of the most important sites for academics in the world — should not be subject to persecution for their work."

Works 
 
 
Elbakyan, Alexandra (2009) "Электроэнцефалограмма человека как биометрическая характеристика в системах контроля доступа" [Human EEG as a biometric feature in access control systems] Bachelor Thesis, Satbayev University.
Elbakyan, Alexandra (2019) "Образ Духа Божьего в текстах еврейской Библии" [Image of the Holy Spirit in Hebrew Bible texts] Master Thesis, Saint Petersburg State University.

See also

 Aaron Swartz
 Anna's Archive
 Copyright abolition
 ICanHazPDF
 Library Genesis
 Open Access
 Peter Sunde
 Z-Library

References

Further reading
 Belluz, Julia (18 February 2016). "Meet Alexandra Elbakyan, the researcher who's breaking the law to make science free for all". Vox.
Murphy, Kate (12 March 2016). "Should All Research Papers Be Free?". The New York Times.
 

Nelson, Felicity (6 February 2019). "How one perplexing pirate is plundering the publishers". The Medical Republic.
Bozkurt, Aras (2021). "A Critical Conversation with Alexandra Elbakyan: Is she the Pirate Queen, Robin Hood, a Scholarly Activist, or a Butterfly Flapping its Wings?". Asian Journal of Distance Education.
Altınışık, Ezgi N. (27 February 2021) "A Robin Hood in the World of Science: Alexandra Elbakyan". Bilim ve Aydınlanma Akademisi.

External links 

 
 Engineuring – Elbakyan's blog

1988 births
21st-century women scientists
Copyright activists
Internet activists
Kazakhstani computer programmers
Kazakhstani transhumanists
Living people
Open content activists
Kazakhstani women computer scientists
Kazakhstani neuroscientists
Kazakhstani women neuroscientists
Kazakhstani people of Armenian descent
Computer security specialists
Kazakhstani activists
Kazakhstani women activists
Saint Petersburg State University alumni
Kazakhstani communists